Andrea Rowley Reeb is an American attorney and politician serving as a member of the New Mexico House of Representatives for the 64th district. Elected in November 2022, she assumed office on January 1, 2023.

Early life and education 
Reeb was born in Ann Arbor, Michigan, and raised in Clovis, New Mexico. After graduating from Clovis High School in 1989, she earned a Bachelor of Arts degree from Creighton University and a Juris Doctor from the Creighton University School of Law.

Career 
Reeb was elected district attorney for New Mexico's Ninth Judicial District in 2014 and served until March 2022. She was elected to the New Mexico House of Representatives in November 2022 and assumed office on January 1, 2023.

Reeb was appointed in August 2022 as a special prosecutor by Santa Fe County's district attorney Mary Carmack-Altwies to assist in the investigation and prosecution of the shooting incident on the set of the film Rust, in which prosecutors said they would charge actor Alec Baldwin with two counts of involuntary manslaughter. On March 14, 2023, Reeb announced she was stepping down as special prosecutor following a motion by Baldwin's attorney to remove her from the case as her new role as legislator may violate the state constitution's separation of powers clause.

References 

Living people
American lawyers
New Mexico lawyers
Creighton University alumni
Creighton University School of Law alumni
Republican Party members of the New Mexico House of Representatives
Women state legislators in New Mexico
People from Ann Arbor, Michigan
People from Clovis, New Mexico
People from Curry County, New Mexico
Year of birth missing (living people)
20th-century American lawyers
20th-century American women lawyers
21st-century American lawyers
21st-century American women lawyers
21st-century American politicians
21st-century American women politicians
District attorneys in New Mexico